Inhambanella is a group of trees in the Sapotaceae described as a genus in 1915.

The genus is native to Africa.

Species
Inhambanella guereensis (Aubrév. & Pellegr.) T.D.Penn. - Ivory Coast, Liberia
Inhambanella henriquezii (Engl. & Warb.) Dubard - Kenya, Tanzania, Malawi, Zimbabwe, Mozambique, KwaZulu-Natal

Formerly included
Inhambanella natalensis (Schinz) Dubard, synonym of Vitellariopsis marginata (N.E.Br.) Aubrév.

References

Sapotoideae
Sapotaceae genera